Confederate is an unincorporated community in Lyon County, Kentucky, United States.

References

Unincorporated communities in Lyon County, Kentucky
Unincorporated communities in Kentucky